The 2008 Stoke-on-Trent City Council election for the Stoke-on-Trent City Council took place on 1 May 2008.  One third of the council was up for election.

Election result

|- style="background-color:#F6F6F6"
| colspan="7" style="text-align: right; margin-right: 0.5em" | Turnout
| style="text-align: right; margin-right: 0.5em" | 30.2
| style="text-align: right; margin-right: 0.5em" | 55,988
| style="text-align: right; margin-right: 0.5em" |
|-

Ward results

2008 English local elections
2000s in Staffordshire
2008